The 1981 Player's International Canadian Open was a tennis tournament played on outdoor hard courts. The men's tournament was held at the Jarry Park Stadium in Montreal in Canada and was part of the 1981 Volvo Grand Prix while the women's tournament was held at the National Tennis Centre in Toronto in Canada and was part of the 1981 WTA Tour. The men's tournament was held from August 10 through August 16, 1981, while the women's tournament was held from August 17 through August 23, 1981.

Finals

Men's singles

 Ivan Lendl defeated  Eliot Teltscher 6–3, 6–2
 It was Lendl's 3rd title of the year and the 12th of his career.

Women's singles
 Tracy Austin defeated  Chris Evert-Lloyd 6–1, 6–4
 It was Austin's 3rd title of the year and the 30th of her career.

Men's doubles
 Raúl Ramírez /  Ferdi Taygan defeated  Peter Fleming /  John McEnroe 2–6, 7–6, 6–4
 It was Ramírez's 5th title of the year and the 71st of his career. It was Taygan's 3rd title of the year and the 7th of his career.

Women's doubles
 Martina Navratilova /  Pam Shriver defeated  Candy Reynolds /  Anne Smith 7–6, 7–6
 It was Navratilova's 11th title of the year and the 112th of her career. It was Shriver's 6th title of the year and the 16th of her career.

References

External links
 
 Association of Tennis Professionals (ATP) tournament profile
 Women's Tennis Association (WTA) tournament profile

Player's Canadian Open
Player's Canadian Open
Player's Canadian Open
Canadian Open (tennis)